Chryseobacterium lineare  is a Gram-negative, rod-shaped, aerobic and non-motile  bacteria from the genus of Chryseobacterium which has been isolated from freshwater from Zhejiang in China.

References

External links
Type strain of Chryseobacterium lineare at BacDive -  the Bacterial Diversity Metadatabase

lineare
Bacteria described in 2017